Karimovo (Kärim) is a rural locality (a village) in Aitovsky Selsoviet, Bizhbulyaksky District, Bashkortostan, Russia. The population was 116 as of 2010. There are 4 streets.

Geography 
Karimovo is located 23 km southwest of Bizhbulyak (the district's administrative centre) by road. Aitovo is the nearest rural locality.

References 

Rural localities in Bizhbulyaksky District